The articular surface for the ulna is called the ulnar notch (sigmoid cavity) of the radius; it is in the distal radius, and is narrow, concave, smooth, and articulates with the head of the ulna forming the distal radioulnar joint.

References 

Radius (bone)